is a Japanese voice actress from Tokyo, Japan. She completed her professional training from Axl-Zero as a third term graduate and became a member of Axl-One since April 1, 2015.

Biography

Filmography

Television animation
2015
My Love Story!!, Elementary School Student

2016
Erased, Osamu
Whistle!, Miyuki Sakurai (voice remake)

2017
Kamisama Minarai: Himitsu no Cocotama, Lychee
Sakura Quest, Yoshino Koharu
Two Car, Izumi Murata

2018
Comic Girls, Miharu Nijino
Tsurune, Noa Shiragiku
Kira Kira Happy Hirake! Cocotama, Miku Mochizuki

2019
Fruits Basket, Kazuma Sōma (young)

2021
Super Cub, Reiko
Mother of the Goddess' Dormitory, Atena Saotome
Fena: Pirate Princess, Mary Read

2022
In the Heart of Kunoichi Tsubaki, Itadori

2023
Soaring Sky! Pretty Cure, Ageha Hijiri/Cure Butterfly

Original video animation
Encouragement of Climb: Omoide Present as Mio (2017)

Animated films
Servamp -Alice in the Garden- as Yuri (2018)
Sound! Euphonium The Movie - Our Promise: A Brand New Day as Mirei Suzuki (2019)
Blackfox as Rikka Isurugi (2019)

Video games 
 Magia Record: Puella Magi Madoka Magica Side Story (2017) as Shizuku Hozumi
 God Eater 3 (2018) as Lulu Baran
 Girls' Frontline (2019) as INSAS, 43M
 Azur Lane (2019) as HMS Hardy, HMS Hunter, KMS U-37
 Da Capo 5 (2023) as Machi de Mikaketa Shoujo

Live-action films
 Black Fox: Age of the Ninja (2019)

Dubbing
The Owl House, Willow Park

References

External links
 Official agency profile 
 

1994 births
Living people
Japanese video game actresses
Japanese voice actresses
Voice actresses from Tokyo